Vikentiy Valeriyovych Voloshyn (born 17 April 2001) is a Ukrainian professional footballer who plays as an attacking midfielder for Oleksandriya, on loan from Dynamo Kyiv.

Club career

Dynamo Kyiv
Vikentiy Voloshyn is a youth product of Dynamo Kyiv, winning the Ukrainian Under-19 League in 2019 and in 2020. In the summer 2022 he returned to the club and played in the Global Tour for Peace. On 13 May 2022, he scored against Flora.

Loan to Desna Chernihiv
In July 2021 he moved on loan to Desna Chernihiv. On 25 July he made his league debut against Chornomorets Odesa, coming on as a substitute in the 81st minute. On 12 September he scored his first goal against Vorskla Poltava. On 21 September he scored against Metalist Kharkiv in the 2021-22 Ukrainian Cup.

Loan to Oleksandriya
In July 2022 he moved on loan to Oleksandriya.

International career
On 27 September 2021, he was called up by the Ukraine national under-21 football team.

Career statistics

Club

Honours
FC Dynamo Kyiv U-19
 Ukrainian Premier League Reserves: (2) 2017-18, 2018-19

References

External links
 
 

2001 births
Living people
Footballers from Kyiv
Ukrainian footballers
Ukraine youth international footballers
Association football midfielders
FC Dynamo Kyiv players
FC Desna Chernihiv players
FC Oleksandriya players
Ukrainian Premier League players